Cerebral amyloid angiopathy (CAA) is a form of angiopathy in which amyloid beta peptide deposits in the walls of small to medium blood vessels of the central nervous system and meninges. The term congophilic is sometimes used because the presence of the abnormal aggregations of amyloid can be demonstrated by microscopic examination of brain tissue after staining with Congo red. The amyloid material is only found in the brain and as such the disease is not related to other forms of amyloidosis.

Signs and symptoms
CAA is associated with brain hemorrhages, particularly microhemorrhages. Since CAA can be caused by the same amyloid protein that is associated with Alzheimer's dementia, brain bleeds are more common in people who have a diagnosis of Alzheimer's disease. However, they can also occur in those who have no history of dementia.  The bleeding within the brain is usually confined to a particular lobe and this is slightly different compared to brain bleeds which occur as a consequence of high blood pressure (hypertension) – a more common cause of a hemorrhagic stroke (or bleeding in the brain).

Causes

CAA has been identified as occurring either sporadically (generally in elderly populations) or in familial forms such as Flemish, Iowa, and Dutch types. In all cases, it is defined by the deposition of amyloid beta (Aβ) in the leptomeningeal and cerebral vessel walls. CAA occurring in the Flemish type has been observed to be linked to large dense-core plaques observed in this pedigree.

The reason for increased deposition of Aβ in sporadic CAA is still unclear with both increased production of the peptide and abnormal clearance having been proposed as potential causes. Under normal physiology Aβ is cleared from the brain by four pathways: (1) endocytosis by astrocytes and microglial cells, (2) enzymatic degradation by neprilysin or insulysin (3) cleared by way of the blood–brain barrier or (4) drained along periarterial spaces. Abnormalities in each of these identified clearance pathways have been linked to CAA.

In familial forms of CAA, the cause of Aβ build up is likely due to increased production rather than poor clearance. Mutations in the amyloid precursor protein (APP), Presenilin (PS) 1 and PS2 genes can result in increased rates of cleavage of the APP into Aβ. An immune mechanism has also been proposed. apolipoprotein E (APOE) ε2 and ε4 are associated with increased risk of getting cerebral amyloid antipathy. The use of antiplatelet and anticoagulant therapy increases the risk of getting intracerebral haemorrhage in CAA.

Types
Several familial variants exist. The condition is usually associated with amyloid beta. However, there are types involving other amyloid peptides:
 the "Icelandic type" is associated with Cystatin C amyloid (ACys).
 the "British type" and "Danish type" are associated with British amyloid (ABri) and Danish amyloid (ADan) respectively. Both peptides are linked to mutations in ITM2B.
 Familial amyloidosis-Finnish type is associated with gelsolin amyloid (AGel).

Pathophysiology
The vascular amyloid pathology characteristic of CAA can be classified as either Type 1 or Type 2, the latter type being the more common. Type 1 CAA pathology entails detectable amyloid deposits within cortical capillaries as well as within the leptomeningeal and cortical arteries and arterioles. In type 2 CAA pathology, amyloid deposits are present in leptomeningeal and cortical arteries and arterioles, but not in capillaries. Deposits in veins or venules are possible in either type but are far less prevalent.

Diagnosis

CAA can only be definitively diagnosed by a post-mortem autopsy. Biopsies can play a role in diagnosing probable cases. When no tissue is available for biopsy, the Boston Criteria are used to determine probable CAA cases from MRI or CT scan data. The Boston Criteria require evidence of multiple lobar or cortical hemorrhages to label a patient as probably having CAA. Susceptibility weighted imaging has been proposed as a tool for identifying CAA-related microhemorrhages.

Imaging
Cerebral amyloid angiopathy can be presented with lobar intracerebral hemorrhage or microbleeds in the brain. The bleeding usually occurs on the surfaces of the brain in contrast with intracranial haemorrhage due to high blood pressure which occurs in deep locations of the brain such as basal ganglia and pons. In lobar intracerebral bleed, computed tomography (CT) scan would show hyperdense haemorrhage area and hypodense odema around the haemorrhagic site.

MRI sequence of gradient echo and susceptibility weighted imaging (SWI) are useful in detecting microbleeds and deposition of iron on the brain cortex (cortical superficial siderosis). Other MRI indicators of CAA include white matter hyperintensities and cortical thinning.

Management
The aim in cerebral amyloid angiopathy is to treat the symptoms, as there is no current cure. Physical, occupational and/or speech therapy may be helpful in the management of this condition.

History
Gustav Oppenheim was the first to report vascular amyloid β deposits on the vasculature of the central nervous system in 1909. The first paper focusing solely on what would come to be known as CAA was published in 1938 by WZ Scholz. In 1979, H. Okazaki published a paper implicating CAA in certain cases of lobar intracerebral hemorrhage. The Boston Criteria for CAA originated in a 1995 paper from Harvard Medical School.

References

Further reading

External links 

Amyloidosis
Vascular diseases
Brain disorders